Təzəkənd is a village and municipality in the Davachi Rayon of Azerbaijan. It is situated near Surra and Mollakamallı.

References

Populated places in Shabran District